The Pike County School District is a public school district in Pike County, Georgia, United States, based in Zebulon. It serves the communities of Concord, Hilltop, Meansville, Molena, Williamson, and Zebulon.  Michael Duncan, Ed.D. is the superintendent of schools.

Schools
The Pike County School District has a Pre-K building, two elementary schools, one middle school, a ninth grade academy and two high schools.  Zebulon High School ranks in the bottom 1% of Georgia schools according to the Georgia Governor's Office of Student Achievement.

Elementary schools
Pike County Primary School
Pike County Elementary School

Middle school
Pike County Middle School

High school
Pike County 9th Grade Academy
Pike County High School
Zebulon High School

References

External links

School districts in Georgia (U.S. state)
Education in Pike County, Georgia